Kaganga is the native name for the following indigenous scripts used in Indonesia:
The Rencong a.k.a. Incung script, used for Kerinci language
The Rejang script, used for Rejang language
The Lampung script, used for Lampung language